Serhiy Volodymyrovych Petrov (born 21 May 1997) is a Ukrainian professional football striker who plays for Ahrobiznes Volochysk.

Career
Petrov attended the different Sportive youth schools in Volyn Oblast. He made his debut for FC Volyn Lutsk played in a main-squad in the game against FC Dnipro Dnipropetrovsk on 1 March 2015 in the Ukrainian Premier League.

References

External links 
 
 

1997 births
Living people
Footballers from Lutsk
Ukrainian footballers
Association football forwards
FC Volyn Lutsk players
FC Zirka Kropyvnytskyi players
FC Lviv players
FC Rukh Lviv players
FC Metalist 1925 Kharkiv players
FC Ahrobiznes Volochysk players
Ukrainian Premier League players
Ukrainian First League players
Sportspeople from Volyn Oblast